A lodgement is an enclave, taken and defended by force of arms against determined opposition, made by increasing the size of a bridgehead, beachhead, or airhead into a substantial defended area, at least the rear parts of which are out of direct line of fire. 
An example is Operation Overlord, the establishment of a large-scale lodgement in Normandy during World War II.

References

Military geography